Bjørn Arve Lund (born 19 January 1981 in Brønnøysund) is a former footballer. He has played for F.K. Bodø/Glimt in the Norwegian Premier League. He started his career for Brønnøysund IL before moving to Bodø.

His spell in Bodø there was hampered with knee injuries. In 2003, he moved to second division club Levanger FK. One highlight includes the opening goal against the illustrious Rosenborg in a cup match (which Levanger ultimately lost).

Midway through the 2007 season, Lund moved back to his former club Brønnøysund IL on a short-term loan deal.

He has played for the Norwegian national team at U-16 level.

References

100% Fotball - Norwegian Premier League statistics

1981 births
Living people
Norwegian footballers
FK Bodø/Glimt players
Eliteserien players
Association football midfielders
People from Brønnøy
Sportspeople from Nordland